Roaratorio, an Irish circus on Finnegans Wake is a musical composition by American avant-garde composer John Cage. It was composed in 1979 for Klaus Schöning of West German Radio, and premiered as one of the entries in Schöning's radio series.

The book used for Roaratorio is Finnegans Wake by James Joyce, a long-time favorite of Cage's. Texts from it appear also in Cage's songs The Wonderful Widow of Eighteen Springs (1942) and Nowth upon Nacht (1984). The text of Roaratorio was published separately as Writing for the Second Time through Finnegans Wake.

References
 Fetterman, William. 1996. John Cage's Theatre Pieces: Notations and Performances. Routledge.  (pp. 216–221)

Media
 Notes towards a re-reading of the “Roaratorio” the work of John Cage and his special relationship to radio at Ràdio Web MACBA

1979 compositions
Compositions by John Cage
Finnegans Wake
Music based on novels